Jean Bardin (1732–1809) was a French historical painter.

Life
Bardin was born at Montbard in 1732. He was a pupil of Louis-Jean-François Lagrenée  and later studied at Rome. He became a popular artist in France, and was admitted into the Academy in 1779. He was made director of the art school at Orléans in 1788. His subjects are partly historical, partly poetical, and sometimes religious. He was the instructor, in the elements of art, of David and Regnault. He died at Orléans in 1809. His daughter, and pupil, was the painter Ambroise-Marguerite Bardin.

Works
 Tullia Drives over the Corpse of her Father

References

Sources

 

1732 births
1809 deaths
People from Montbard
18th-century French painters
French male painters
19th-century French painters
French history painters
19th-century French male artists
18th-century French male artists